Lincoln Township is a township in Dickinson County, Kansas, USA.  As of the 2000 census, its population was 1,669.

Lincoln Township was organized in 1872.

Geography
According to the USGS, it contains one cemetery, Prairie Mound.

The stream of Solomon River runs through this township.

Further reading

References

 USGS Geographic Names Information System (GNIS)

External links
 City-Data.com

Townships in Dickinson County, Kansas
Townships in Kansas